Ace Crawford, Private Eye is an American sitcom that aired on CBS from March 15 to April 12, 1983. The series parodied the "hard-boiled detective" genre.

Synopsis
Tim Conway stars as a trench-coated private investigator who always solves the case and catches the bad guy, despite his constant bumbling. The show was broadcast on Tuesdays at 8 p.m. ET. Only five episodes were aired.

Cast and characters

 Tim Conway as Ace Crawford, Private Eye.
 Joe Regalbuto as Toomey, a CPA and Crawford's assistant; he always saw Crawford as a hero, and thought that his bumbling was simply some kind of cunning strategy.
 Billy Barty as Inch, owner and bartender of The Shanty, a wharfside bar where Crawford hangs out.
 Shera Danese as Luana, a singer at The Shanty who lusted after Crawford.
 Bill Henderson as Mello, a blind jazz musician at The Shanty.
 Dick Christie as Detective Lieutenant Fanning, who was always mystified as to how Crawford solved every case.

Format
In each half-hour episode, Crawford would be hired for, or otherwise find himself involved in, a case in which criminals were taking advantage of innocent citizens. He would then approach the case using Conway's trademark comedy style; in one episode he was disguised as a feeble old man, in another he was using a children's toy microphone as a "wire." In spite of the slapstick results of his actions, Crawford would always emerge triumphant.

Every episode ended the same way: Crawford would leave The Shanty at night and walk along the wharf, vanishing into the fog... and then audibly fall into the water.

Each episode was on film (as opposed to videotape), and had a laugh track.

US TV ratings

Episodes

Availability
In 1989, a VHS videocassette was released containing the first three episodes. The show sat untouched until August 2020 when Shout! Factory TV acquired complete streaming rights.

References

External links
 

1983 American television series debuts
1983 American television series endings
1980s American sitcoms
American detective television series
American parody television series
CBS original programming
English-language television shows
Television series by CBS Studios
Television shows set in New York City